Clogging is a type of folk dance practiced in the United States, in which the dancer's footwear is used percussively by striking the heel, the toe, or both against a floor or each other to create audible rhythms, usually to the downbeat with the heel keeping the rhythm.

Clogging is the official state dance of Kentucky and North Carolina.

Description

In later periods, it was not always called "clogging", being known variously as foot-stomping, buck dancing, clog dancing, jigging, or other local terms. What all these had in common was emphasizing the downbeat of the music by enthusiastic footwork. As for the shoes, many old clogging shoes had no taps and some were made of leather and velvet, while the soles of the shoes were either wooden or hard leather.

Clogging can be divided into five major categories: 1) shuffle clogging, 2) cadence clogging, 3) rhythm clogging, 4) stomp clogging, and 5) buck-dancing.

The shuffle clogging style is said to be the most popular style for bluegrass music cloggers while rhythm and stomp clogging are more popular with old-time music cloggers. What sets clogging apart from other dance styles such as tap dancing is the lack of upper body movement used during performance like Irish Sean-nós dance which had significant influence on the origins of the dance. While tap dancers place emphasis on stage presence and arm movements, cloggers limit their upper body movement, focusing primarily on their feet.

Antecedents
In the United States, team clogging originated from square dance teams in Asheville, North Carolina's Mountain Dance and Folk Festival (1928), organized by Bascom Lamar Lunsford in the Appalachian region.

The Soco Gap Dancers performed at the White House in 1939, which caused an uptick in the popularity of team clogging.

American Clogging is associated with the predecessor to bluegrass—"old-time" music, which is based on English, and Irish fiddle tunes as well as African American banjo tunes. Clogging primarily developed from Irish step dancing called Sean-nós dance; there were also English, Scottish, German, and Cherokee step dances, as well as African rhythms and movement influences too. It was from clogging that tap dance eventually evolved. Now, many clogging teams compete against other teams for prizes such as money and trophies.

Terminology
The term "buck," as in buck dancing, is traceable to the West Indies and is derived from a Tupi Indian word denoting a frame for drying and smoking meat; the original 'po bockarau' or buccaneers were sailors who smoked meat and fish after the manner of the Indians. Another source states that the word "bockorau" can be traced to the "Angolan" word "buckra', and was used to refer to white people, which is disputed. Eventually the term came to describe Irish immigrant sailors whose jig dance was known as 'the buck.'"  

Another origin of the term "buck dance" comes from the idea that this style of dance was a flirtation.  The male dancer would show off his skills on the dance floor to attract the female, thus being compared to the buck's (male deer) courting ritual of the doe (female deer).

One source states that buck dancing was the earliest combination of the basic shuffle and tap steps performed to syncopated rhythms in which accents are placed not on the straight beat, as with the jigs, clogs, and other dances of European origin, but on the downbeat or offbeat, a style derived primarily from the rhythms of African tribal music.

Yet another etymology of the word argues that it derives from the word "buck," used as a pejorative term for African American men in the 19th century. Buck dancing was popularized in America by minstrel performers in the late 19th century. Many folk festivals and fairs utilize dancing clubs or teams to perform both Buck and regular clogging for entertainment.

Traditional Appalachian clogging is characterized by loose, often bent knees and a "drag-slide" motion of the foot across the floor, and is usually performed to old-time music.

See also
 Buckdancer's Choice
 Clog dancing
 Ira Bernstein
 Limberjack
 Sean-nós dance including as practiced in America
 Step dance

References
Notes

Bibliography
 
 
 
 
  Review and criticism of 

 
 
 
Frank X. Bonner (1983) Clogging and the Southern Appalachian Square Dance, Creative Imprints of Marietta, Georgia, US

Tap dance
Uses of shoes
Appalachian culture
American folk dances